South Derbyshire District Council elections are held every four years. South Derbyshire District Council is the local authority for the non-metropolitan district of South Derbyshire in Derbyshire, England. Since the last boundary changes in 2011, 36 councillors have been elected from 15 wards.

Political control
The first election to the council was held in 1973, initially operating as a shadow authority before coming into its powers on 1 April 1974. Since 1973 political control of the council has been held by the following parties:

Leadership
The leaders of the council since 2001 have been:

Council elections
1973 South Derbyshire District Council election
1976 South Derbyshire District Council election
1979 South Derbyshire District Council election (New ward boundaries)
1983 South Derbyshire District Council election
1987 South Derbyshire District Council election
1991 South Derbyshire District Council election (District boundary changes took place but the number of seats remained the same)
1995 South Derbyshire District Council election
1999 South Derbyshire District Council election
2003 South Derbyshire District Council election (New ward boundaries)
2007 South Derbyshire District Council election
2011 South Derbyshire District Council election (New ward boundaries)
2015 South Derbyshire District Council election
2019 South Derbyshire District Council election

By-election results

1995-1999

1999-2003

2003-2007

2007-2011

2015-2019

2019-2023

References

External links
 South Derbyshire Council

 
South Derbyshire District
Council elections in Derbyshire
South Derbyshire